Agathis silbae is a species of conifer in the family Araucariaceae. It is found only in Vanuatu. It is threatened by habitat loss.

Named after New York botanist John Silba, the Forestry Department in Vanuatu recognise it as a synonym of Agathis macrophylla.

References

silbae
Taxonomy articles created by Polbot
Taxa named by David John de Laubenfels